Trilophosaurs are lizard-like Triassic allokotosaur reptiles related to the archosaurs. It had a short, unusually heavily built skull, equipped with massive, broad flattened cheek teeth with sharp shearing surfaces for cutting up tough plant material. Teeth are absent from the premaxilla and front of the lower jaw, which in life were probably equipped with a horny beak.
 
The skull is also unusual in that the lower temporal opening is missing, giving the appearance of a euryapsid skull, and originally the Trilophosaurs were classified with placodonts and sauropterygia.  Carroll (1988) suggests that the lower opening may have been lost to strengthen the skull.

Trilophosaurs are so far known only from the Late Triassic of North America and Europe.

Below is a cladogram showing the phylogenetic relationships of Trilophosauridae within Archosauromorpha as recovered by Nesbitt et al. (2015).

References

Sources 
 Benton, M. J. (2000), Vertebrate Paleontology, 2nd ed. Blackwell Science Ltd, p. 144

External links 
 Archosauromorpha: Rhynchosaurs and Trilophosaurus at Palaeos
 Trilophosauria. Beaked, lizard-like reptiles. UC Museum of Paleontology. Archive copy from 6 February 2019.

Allokotosaurs
Prehistoric reptile families
Triassic reptiles
Anisian first appearances
Rhaetian extinctions